Atli Eðvaldsson (3 March 1957 – 2 September 2019) was an Icelandic professional footballer who played as a midfielder, widely regarded as one of the most influential players to come from Iceland. During his career, he won the Icelandic championship three times and the Icelandic Cup four times.
After retiring from playing, he became a well-known manager. In 1999, he guided Knattspyrnufélag Reykjavíkur to its first championship in 31 years. Atli played 70 games for the Icelandic national team from 1976 to 1991. He later coached the national team from 1999 to 2003.

Club career
Atli started at Valur and later became very successful in the German Bundesliga with Fortuna Düsseldorf and Bayer Uerdingen. On 6 June 1983, he became the first foreign player to score a five goals in one game in the Bundesliga, when he scored five goals for Fortuna Düsseldorf in a 5–1 victory against Eintracht Frankfurt. After the game, he took a flight to Iceland where he scored the winning goal in Iceland's 1–0 victory against Malta the following day. For the season, he scored 21 goals in 34 matches for Düsseldorf, finishing second in the league.

After a year in Turkey, he finished his playing career back in Iceland, where he became player-manager.

International career
He made his debut for Iceland in 1976 and went on to win 70 caps, scoring eight goals and captaining the team 31 times. He played his last international match in a September 1991 friendly game against Denmark. After Ásgeir Elíasson became Iceland's manager in 1991, he announced that Atli was not in the future plans of the team. At the time he was Iceland's record cap.

Managerial career
After his playing days ended, Atli went on to manage three Icelandic club teams before taking the helm at the national team in 1999 where he stayed for four years. On 4 July 2009, Atli was appointed manager of Úrvalsdeild karla club Valur until the end of the season.

He last coached Hamar in the 4. deild karla in 2018.

Roger Hollis case
Chapman Pincher alleged that Atli was the owner of certain documents that might add further weight to the case against Roger Hollis, that Hollis was a Russian spy at the head of MI-5 in the UK. As Pincher, who died in 2014, stated "I have been unable to extract a copy of the interrogation report from Atli", p. 603. The interrogation report was alleged by Pincher to have been written by his deceased father, Evald Mikson.

Personal life
Atli was the younger brother of former international player Jóhannes Eðvaldsson. His father, Evald Mikson (Icelandic: Eðvald Hinriksson), was a goalkeeper in the Estonian national football team between 1934 and 1938. Evald was the Tallinn chief of police during the German occupation of Estonia during World War II.

Atli's daughter Sif Atladóttir is a member of the women's national football team.

Illness and death
In December 2018, he revealed in an interview with RÚV that he had been battling a serious illness for two years and that initially the doctors only gave him two weeks to live. On 2 September 2019, Atli died from cancer.

References

External links
 
 

1957 births
2019 deaths
Atli Edvaldsson
Association football midfielders
Atli Edvaldsson
Atli Edvaldsson
Borussia Dortmund players
KFC Uerdingen 05 players
Fortuna Düsseldorf players
Gençlerbirliği S.K. footballers
Atli Edvaldsson
Bundesliga players
Süper Lig players
Atli Edvaldsson
Atli Edvaldsson
Atli Edvaldsson
Atli Edvaldsson
Atli Edvaldsson
TuRU Düsseldorf players
Atli Edvaldsson
Atli Edvaldsson
Afturelding (football)
Atli Edvaldsson
Icelandic expatriate sportspeople in Germany
Expatriate footballers in Germany
Icelandic expatriate sportspeople in Turkey
Expatriate footballers in Turkey